Casino Royale may refer to:
Casino Royale (novel), the first James Bond novel by Ian Fleming
"Casino Royale" (Climax!), a 1954 television adaptation of Fleming's novel for the series Climax!
Casino Royale (1967 film), a James Bond film parody starring David Niven and Peter Sellers
Casino Royale (2006 film), a James Bond film starring Daniel Craig
Casino Royale (2006 soundtrack), the soundtrack of the 2006 film
Casino Royale, casino brand at Hotel Splendid in Montenegro
Casino Royale Hotel & Casino, a hotel and casino on the strip in Las Vegas, United States
Casino Royale, site of the 2011 Monterrey casino attack, a massacre that killed 52 in Mexico
Casino Royale is a brand of casinos on the Royal Caribbean International cruise ships.
Casino Royale, an Italian funk rock band formed in 1987.